ACR may refer to:

Medicine
 Albumin/creatinine ratio in urine
 ACR score for rheumatoid arthritis
 ACR gene, encoding the enzyme acrosin
 American College of Radiology
 American College of Rheumatology

Places
 Accrington railway station, UK, National Rail code
 Araracuara Airport,  Colombia, IATA code

Science and technology
 Absolute Category Rating, a subjective quality test method
 Acumulador de Carga Rápida, a battery electric tram system
 Advanced CANDU reactor, a nuclear reactor
 Advanced Communications Riser, a PC slot format
 Advanced Contrast Ratio or Dynamic Contrast in an LCD display 
 Copper tubing for air conditioning and refrigeration 
 Antarctic Cold Reversal, climatic cooling about 14,500 years ago
 Attenuation-to-crosstalk ratio of communication links
 Automatic content recognition of video
 Adobe Camera Raw, a raw image file converter

Military and weapons
 Adaptive Combat Rifle
 Advanced Combat Rifle, a US Army program
 Armored cavalry regiment of the US army or national guard
 AČR, Army of the Czech Republic (Armáda České republiky)
 Steyr ACR, an Austrian assault rifle

Other uses
 A Certain Ratio, a British post-punk band
 Accelerated chart ratio, affects streaming totals in the Official Charts Company's singles chart
 Achi language, a Mayan language of Guatemala
 Americas Cardroom, online poker site
 Dodge Viper ACR, a car